Deathstalker is a species of scorpion, Leiurus quinquestriatus, also known as Omdurman scorpion or the Israeli desert scorpion.

Deathstalker may also refer to:

 Death-Stalker, a Marvel Comics supervillain character, first appearing in 1968
 Deathstalker (film), a 1983 sword-and-sorcery film, and its sequels:
 Deathstalker II (1987)
 Deathstalker and the Warriors from Hell (1988)
 Deathstalker IV: Match of Titans (1990)
 Deathstalker (series), a series of science fiction novels by Simon R. Green
 Deathstalker (novel)
 Death Stalker, a 1988 video game designed by Tony Warriner